Percy Loomis Sperr (P.L. Sperr) (1890–1964) was an early 20th century New York City photographer. He is most widely known for his street photography of New York City that was done under contract for the New York Public Library from the early 1920s until the early 1940s. During those two decades, he took 30,000 to 45,000 photographs of the five boroughs of New York. His favorite subjects were his home borough of Staten Island and the many harbors of New York.

References

External links

 Percy Loomis Sperr on Find A Grave
 Smith-Peter, Susan (2021). To See a City: Percy Loomis Sperr and the Total Photographic Documentation of New York City, 1924-45. Blog at the Gotham Center for NYC History, CUNY Graduate Center. https://www.gothamcenter.org/blog/lg4t4th8vfvm6xrzgefg5jjje3v0vm

1890 births
1964 deaths
20th-century American photographers
Photographers from New York City
Street photographers